The clades Lolliana or Lollian disaster was a battle in 16 BCE, when the consul Marcus Lollius was defeated by the Sicambri, Tencteri and Usipetes, Germanic tribes who had crossed the Rhine. This defeat is coupled by the historian Suetonius with the disaster of Publius Quinctilius Varus in the Battle of the Teutoburg Forest.

See also
 Chronology of warfare between the Romans and Germanic tribes

References

Velleius Paterculus 2.97.1
Cassius Dio 54.20.4-5

10s BC conflicts
Battles involving the Roman Empire
Battles involving Germanic peoples
16 BC
1st century BC
1st-century BC battles